A samosa or singara is a fried South Asian pastry with a savoury filling, including ingredients such as spiced potatoes, onions, and peas. It may take different forms, including triangular, cone, or half-moon shapes, depending on the region. Samosas are often accompanied by chutney, and have origins in medieval times or earlier. Samosas are a popular entrée, appetizer, or snack in the cuisines of South Asia, the Middle East, Central Asia, East Africa and their South Asian diasporas.

The English word samosa derives from Hindustani word '', traceable to the Middle Persian word  'triangular pastry'. Similar pastries are called  in Arabic; Medieval Arabic recipe books sometimes spell it .

Spanakopita is a similar dish cooked in Greece.

Muska böreği  is a similar dish cooked in Turkey

History
 

The South Asian samosa is believed to be derived from a medieval precursor from Central Asia that was baked not fried. The earliest mention of a samosa precursor was by Abbasid-era poet Ishaq al-Mawsili, praising the sanbusaj. Recipes are found in 10th–13th-century Arab cookery books, under the names sanbusak, sanbusaq, and sanbusaj, all deriving from the Persian word . Abolfazl Beyhaqi (995–1077), an Iranian historian, mentioned it in his history, Tarikh-e Beyhaghi.

The Central Asian samsa was introduced to the Indian subcontinent in the 13th or 14th century by chefs from the Middle East and Central Asia who cooked in the royal kitchens for the rulers of the Delhi Sultanate. Amir Khusro (1253–1325), a scholar and the royal poet of the Delhi Sultanate, wrote in around 1300 CE that the princes and nobles enjoyed the "samosa prepared from meat, ghee, onion, and so on". Ibn Battuta, a 14th-century traveler and explorer, describes a meal at the court of Muhammad bin Tughluq, where the samushak or sambusak, a small pie stuffed with minced meat, almonds, pistachios, walnuts and spices, was served before the third course, of pulao. Nimatnama-i-Nasiruddin-Shahi, a medieval Indian cookbook started for Ghiyath Shah, the ruler of the Malwa Sultanate in central India, mentions the art of making samosa. The Ain-i-Akbari, a 16th-century Mughal document, mentions the recipe for qottab, which it says, "the people of Hindustan call sanbúsah".

Regional varieties

India 
The samosa is prepared with an all-purpose flour (locally known as maida) and stuffed with a filling, often a mixture of diced and cooked or mashed boiled potato (preferably diced), onions, green peas, lentils, ginger, spices and green chili. A samosa can be vegetarian or non-vegetarian, depending on the filling. The entire pastry is deep-fried in vegetable oil or rarely ghee to a golden brown. It is served hot, often with fresh green chutney, such as mint, coriander, or tamarind. It can also be prepared in a sweet form. Samosas are often served in chaat, along with the traditional accompaniments of either a chickpea or a white pea preparation, served with yogurt, tamarind paste and green chutney, garnished with chopped onions, coriander, and chaat masala.

In the Indian states of Assam, Odisha, West Bengal, Bihar and Jharkhand, singaras or singras (the East Indian version of samosas) are popular snacks found almost everywhere. They are a bit smaller than in other parts of India, with a filling consisting chiefly of cooked diced potato, peanuts, and sometimes raisins. Shingras are wrapped in a thin sheet of dough (made of all purpose flour) and fried. Good shingras are distinguished by flaky textures akin to that of a savory pie crust.

Singaras may be eaten as a tea time snack. They can also be prepared in a sweet form. Bengali singaras tend to be triangular, filled with potato, peas, onions, diced almonds, or other vegetables, and are more heavily fried and crunchier than either singaras or their Indian samosa cousins. Singara filled with cauliflower mixture is a popular variation. Non-vegetarian varieties of singaras are mutton singaras and fish singaras.There are also sweeter versions, such as  coconut singara, as well as others filled with khoya and dipped in sugar syrup.

In the city of Hyderabad, India, a smaller version of samosa with a thicker pastry crust and mince-meat filling, referred to as lukhmi, is consumed, as is another variation with an onion filling.

In the states of Andhra Pradesh, Karnataka, Kerala, and Tamil Nadu, samosas are slightly different, being folded differently, more like Portuguese , with a different style of pastry. The filling also differs, typically featuring mashed potatoes with spices, fried onions, peas, carrots, cabbage, curry leaves, and green chilis, and is mostly eaten without chutney. Samosas in South India are made in different sizes, whose fillings are influenced by local food habits, and may include meat.

Bangladesh 

Both flat-shaped (triangular) and full-shaped (tetrahedron/triangular pyramid) samosas are popular snacks in Bangladesh. The  is usually filled with pieced potatoes, vegetables, nuts, etc. However,  filled with beef liver are very popular in some parts of the country.

Nepal 
Samosas are called  in the eastern zone of Nepal; the rest of the country calls it samosa. As in India, it is a very popular snack in Nepalese cuisine. Vendors sell the dish in various markets and restaurants.

Pakistan 
Samosas of various types are available throughout Pakistan. In general, most samosa varieties sold in the southern Sindh province and in the eastern Punjab, especially the city of Lahore, are spicier and mostly contain vegetable or potato-based fillings. However, the samosas sold in the west and north of the country mostly contain minced meat-based fillings and are comparatively less spicy. The meat samosa contains minced meat (lamb, beef, or chicken) and are very popular as snack food in Pakistan.

In Pakistan, samosas of Karachi are famous for their spicy flavour, whereas samosas from Faisalabad are noted for being unusually large. Another distinct variety of samosa, available in Karachi, is called  ("paper samosa" in English) due to its thin and crispy covering, which resembles a wonton or spring roll wrapper. Another variant, popular in Punjab, consists of samosas with side dishes of mashed spiced chickpeas, onions, and coriander leaf salad, as well as various chutneys to top the samosas. The samosas are a fried or baked pastry with a savory filling, such as spiced potatoes, onions, peas, lentils, and minced meat (lamb, beef or chicken). 
Sweet samosas are also sold in the cities of Pakistan including Peshawar; these sweet samosas contain no filling and are dipped in thick sugar syrup.

Another Pakistani snack food, which is popular in Punjab, is known as "". This is a combination of a crumbled samosa, along with spiced chickpeas (channa chaat), yogurt, and chutneys. Alternatively, the samosa can be eaten on its own with a side of chutney.

In Pakistan, samosas are a staple Iftar food for many Pakistani families, during the month of Ramzan.

Maldives 
They are filled with a mixture including fish or tuna and onions.

Ethiopia 
The variety of samosa made in Ethiopian cuisine is known as "sambusa" or "lentil sambusa" and is filled with lentils. Due to it being vegan, it's often consumed during Ethiopian Orthodox fasts.

Similar snacks 

Similar snacks and variants of samosas are found in many other countries. They are derived either from the South Asian  or are derived from the medieval precursor that originated in the Middle East.

Central Asia

Tajikistan
 are meat-filled pastries, usually triangle-shaped, in Tajik cuisine. The filling can be made with ground beef (or the more traditional mutton mixed with tail fat) and then onions, spices, cumin seeds and other seasonings before being baked in a tandyr.

Southeast Asia

Burma

Samosas are called  (စမူဆာ) in Burmese, and are an extremely popular street snack in Burma. Samosas are also used in a traditional Burmese salad, called samuza thoke, a salad of cut samosa pieces with onions, cabbage, fresh mint, light potato and chickpea curry broth, masala, chili powder, salt and lime.

Indonesia

In Indonesia, samosas are locally known as samosa, filled with potato, cheese, curry, rousong or noodles as adapted to local taste. It usually served as snack with sambal. Samosa is almost similar to Indonesian pastel, panada and epok-epok.

Africa

East Africa
Samosas are also a key part of East Africa food often seen in Tanzania, Kenya, Uganda, Burundi and Rwanda.

Horn of Africa

Also made in Ethiopia and Eritrea where the "sambusa" is usually made from lentils and blended with traditional spices. They are traditionally made with a thinner pastry dough, similar to egg roll, and stuffed with ground beef. While they can be eaten at any time of the year, they are usually reserved for special occasions.

South Africa
Called samoosas in South Africa, they tend to be smaller than Indian variants, and form part of South African Indian and Cape Malay cuisine.

West Africa
Samosas also exist in West African countries such as Ghana and Nigeria where they are a common street food. In Nigeria, it is usually served in parties along with chicken or beef, puff puff, Spring roll and plantain and it is called small chops.

Mascarenes
Samosas, locally called Samoussas are also a very popular snack on Réunion and Mauritius as both countries have faced huge waves of labor immigration from the Indian subcontinent. The samosas there are generally smaller and filled with chicken, cheese, crabs or potatoes. There are however also varieties such as chocolate and banana or pizza.

Middle East

Arab countries

Sambousek are usually filled with either meat, onion, and pine nuts, or cheese.
They are widely consumed in the holy month of Ramadan.

Iran

Sambuseh can be found only in a very few areas in modern Iran—the original home of this meal. However, in the form of qottab---filled with ground nuts (usually, walnuts), sugar, fragrant herbs or spices, and likewise fried in oil, is used as a confectionary and quite commonly.  When meat is used, it is no longer called qottab, but made spicy (contrary to nearly all other Persian culinary products). This last is all that remains of the old "sanbusag" in its ancient homeland.

Israel

In Israel, a  may be a semicircular pocket of dough filled with mashed chickpeas, fried onions, and spices. Another variety is filled with meat, fried onions, parsley, spices, and pine nuts, which is sometimes mixed with mashed chickpeas and breakfast version with feta or tzfat cheese and za'atar. Other common fillings are potato and "pizza", which is somewhat similar to Calzone. It is associated with Mizrahi Jewish cuisine, and various recipes have been brought to Israel by Jewish migrants from other countries in the Middle East and Africa. According to food historian Gil Marks, sambusak has been a traditional part of the Sephardic Sabbath meal since the 13th century in Spain.

Portuguese-speaking regions
They are usually filled with chicken, beef, pork, lamb or vegetables, and generally served quite hot. Samosas are an integral part of Goan and Portuguese cuisine, where they are a common snack.

English-speaking regions
Samosas are popular in the United Kingdom, Australia, New Zealand, Trinidad and Tobago, Guyana, Uganda, South Africa, Rwanda, Kenya and Tanzania, and are also growing in popularity in Canada, and the United States. They may be called samboosa or sambusac, but in South Africa, they are often called samoosa. Frozen samosas are increasingly available from grocery stores in Australia, Canada, the United States, and the United Kingdom, where they are also frequently sold fresh by local Indian and Pakistani street market vendors.

Variations using filo, or flour tortillas are sometimes found.

Al-Shabaab's samosa ban

Al-Shabaab, the extremist group controlling parts of Somalia, banned samosas in 2011 because of the possible use of rotten meat in the filling. Initial reports claimed that the ban was because the triangular shape could represent the Christian holy trinity, but were later corrected.

See also

References

External links

Pastries
Central Asian cuisine
Bangladeshi fast food
Bangladeshi snack foods
Indian snack foods
Indonesian snack foods
Middle Eastern cuisine
Sephardi Jewish cuisine
Stuffed dishes
Kashmiri cuisine
Burmese cuisine
Goan cuisine
Pakistani fast food
Pakistani snack foods
Indian fast food
Somali cuisine
Malaysian cuisine
Singaporean cuisine
Nepalese cuisine
Portuguese cuisine
Odia cuisine
Iranian pastries
Brazilian cuisine
South African cuisine
Eritrean cuisine
Ethiopian cuisine
Kenyan cuisine
Djiboutian cuisine
Deep fried foods
Tajik cuisine
South Asian cuisine
North Indian cuisine
South Indian cuisine
Dumplings
Arab pastries
Bangladeshi cuisine
Pakistani cuisine
Indo-Caribbean cuisine
Fijian cuisine